Charlotte Lucas (born 29 May 1976) is an English actress. She is best known for her roles as Dr Kingsley in Not Going out Eastenders as Yvonne and Bad Girls as Selena Geeson.

Early life and education
Born into an acting family, Lucas is the daughter of actress Susan Travers  and photographer Cornel Lucas. Her grandmother was actress Linden Travers and her great-uncle was Bill Travers.

Lucas attended drama and theatre studies at Birmingham University, before concluding her studies at Royal Academy of Dramatic Art (RADA) in London.

Career
She is best known for her role as Selena Geeson in Bad Girls. She also starred in the 2003 film Oh Marbella!, as well as a number of other TV roles including EastEnders, Midsomer Murders, Doctors, Not Going Out, and an episode of Adventure Inc. when filming transferred to the UK for four episodes. Lucas played the role of Mrs Bassat in BBC One's 2014 adaptation of Daphne du Maurier's novel Jamaica Inn.

In 2017, she appeared in the third series of Broadchurch.

Filmography

References

External links
 
 Charlotte Lucas at RADA
 Charlotte Lucas at UKCP

Alumni of RADA
Living people
English television actresses
1976 births